FEMS Microbiology Reviews is a peer-reviewed scientific journal publishing invited review articles in the field of microbiology. The journal was established in 1985, and is published by Oxford University Press on behalf of the Federation of European Microbiological Societies. The editors-in-chief are Karin Sauer, David Blackbourn, and Bart Thomma.

Abstracting and indexing
The journal is indexed and abstracted in the following bibliographic databases:

According to the Journal Citation Reports, the journal has a 2020 impact factor of 16.408, ranking it 6th out of 137 journals in the category "Microbiology".

References

External links

English-language journals
Microbiology journals
Oxford University Press academic journals
Semi-monthly journals
Publications established in 1985
Federation of European Microbiological Societies academic journals